Jawaan Taylor (born November 25, 1997) is an American football offensive tackle for the Kansas City Chiefs of the National Football League (NFL). He played college football at Florida. He was drafted by the Jacksonville Jaguars in the 2nd round (35th overall) of the 2019 NFL Draft.

Early years
Taylor attended Cocoa High School in Cocoa, Florida. He was originally committed to the University of Miami to play college football before switching to the University of Florida.

College career
Taylor became a starter at the University of Florida his true freshman year in 2016. After his junior season in 2018, he decided to forgo his senior year and enter the 2019 NFL Draft.

Professional career

Jacksonville Jaguars
Taylor was drafted by the Jacksonville Jaguars in the second round (35th overall) of the 2019 NFL Draft.

Taylor was placed on the reserve/COVID-19 list by the Jaguars on July 28, 2020, but was activated five days later.

In his four years in Jacksonville, Taylor started every regular season game at right tackle, playing nearly every snap.

Kansas City Chiefs
On March 16, 2023, Taylor signed a four-year, $80 million contract with the Kansas City Chiefs.

References

External links
Florida Gators bio

1997 births
Living people
People from Cocoa, Florida
Players of American football from Florida
American football offensive tackles
Florida Gators football players
Jacksonville Jaguars players
Kansas City Chiefs players